Rissen railway station in Hamburg, Germany, is located on the extended Altona-Blankenese line and is served by the trains of the Hamburg S-Bahn.

The rapid transit trains of the line S1 of the Hamburg S-Bahn call the station in the Rissen quarter of the Hamburg borough of Altona.

History
When the steam railway line to Wedel was opened on 1 December 1883, also a station in the small village of Rissen was established. It was then also used for freight traffic and had 3 tracks, the third of which was a siding south of the two platform tracks, which was later removed. Electrification of the line to Wedel was completed on 20 May 1954. In May 1983 the new Rissen station opened next to the new Bundesstraße (federal road) 431 in a terrain cutting soon dubbed by the inhabitants as "Rissen Canyon". The old station, a small building similar to the Sülldorf station, had to be demolished afterwards in order to complete the cutting with the new federal road.

Station layout
The station is situated in a terrain cutting with an island platform and 2 tracks. There is no service personnel attending the station, but an SOS and information telephone is available. There are some places to lock a bicycle as well as a few parking spots. The station is fully accessible for handicapped persons, as there is a lift and a ramp. Also a public toilet and a taxi stand can be found near the station. There are no lockerboxes.

Services
On track no. 1 the trains in direction Wedel and on track no. 2 the trains in direction Hamburg center and toward Airport/Poppenbüttel call the station. A bus stop in front of the railway station is called by metro bus line 1, the nearby bus stop of Rissener Dorfstraße also by line 286 and night bus lines 601 and 621.

Gallery

See also

Hamburger Verkehrsverbund (HVV) (Public transport association in Hamburg)

References

External links
DB station information 

Hamburg S-Bahn stations in Hamburg
Buildings and structures in Altona, Hamburg
Railway stations in Germany opened in 1883